Antonio Díaz-Miguel Sanz (July 6, 1933 – February 21, 2000) was a Spanish professional basketball player and coach. He studied in Madrid, and graduated from the University of Bilbao.

A pioneer in the worldwide promotion of basketball, he won several coaching awards, and was a frequent basketball lecturer around the world. He was enshrined into the Basketball Hall of Fame, as a coach, on September 29, 1997. In 2007, he was enshrined into the FIBA Hall of Fame.

Basketball playing career

Club career
Although initially a football player in his youth, Díaz-Miguel's physical characteristics, including a 1.86 m (6'1 1 ") barefoot height, and also his determination, contributed to his start in basketball, as a player, at the Instituto Ramiro de Maeztu Secondary School of Madrid, where the Estudiantes ("students") club was founded in 1950, with pupils and teachers of the school.  He was a player of Estudiantes Club of Madrid in 1950–52, and 1953–1958, and later also played with Real Madrid (1958–1961), and Águilas Bilbao (1961–1963). He won the top-tier level Spanish Clubs League championship twice, in 1960 and 1961, with Real Madrid.

Spain national team
Díaz-Miguel had 27 caps as a player of the senior Spain national basketball team. He won a gold medal at the 1955 Mediterranean Games. He also won a silver medal at the 1959 Mediterranean Games.

Basketball coaching career
Immediately after his retirement from his basketball playing career, Díaz-Miguel started coaching Águilas Bilbao. Following that, he later provisionally, and nearly by chance, became the head coach of the senior Spain National Team, where he managed to develop longstanding success for the team, and the sport of basketball in Spain. He was the head coach of the senior Spain national basketball team, for as long as 27 years (1965–1992).

In 431 games coached, Díaz-Miguel guided the Spain National Team to six Summer Olympic Games tournaments, including a silver medal at the 1984 Summer Olympic Games, in Los Angeles. That was the top classification for the Spain National Team until the 2008 Summer Olympics, when they finished second again. Díaz-Miguel's Spain National teams also participated in 13 EuroBaskets and four FIBA World Cups, and his team's best finishes were two silver medals (EuroBasket 1973, EuroBasket 1983), and one bronze medal (EuroBasket 1991) in the EuroBasket. He also won a silver medal at the 1987 Mediterranean Games.

He was named "Spanish Coach of the Year", in 1981 and 1983. Díaz-Miguel was selected as a coach of the FIBA European Selection teams five times.

References

External links
Basketball Hall of Fame Profile
FIBA Hall of Fame Coach Profile
Scheda su seleccionbaloncesto.es 
Italian League Coach Profile 
Antonio Diaz-Miguel, a basketball engineer
Antonio Díaz Miguel: El mito del baloncesto español, un adelantado a su época 
ANTONIO DIAZ-MIGUEL 

1933 births
2000 deaths
CB Estudiantes players
Centers (basketball)
FIBA Hall of Fame inductees
Liga ACB head coaches
Naismith Memorial Basketball Hall of Fame inductees
Pallacanestro Cantù coaches
Power forwards (basketball)
Real Madrid Baloncesto players
Spanish basketball coaches
Spanish men's basketball players
University of the Basque Country alumni
Spanish Olympic coaches
People from Ciudad Real
Sportspeople from the Province of Ciudad Real
Deaths from cancer in Spain